The Kinks Are Well Respected Men is a two disc compilation album by British rock group the Kinks, released in 1987. The album consists of all the non-album singles and b-sides released in the UK by the Kinks from 1964 to 1970. It also includes all of the tracks from the 1964 Kinksize Session EP and the 1965 Kwyet Kinks EP.

The album was issued on both double CD (PYC 7001) and double LP (PYL 7001) formats and is now a much sought-after item due to the excellent sound quality and comprehensive nature of the compilation.

Track listing
All songs by Ray Davies except as noted.

Disc 1
 "Long Tall Sally" (Johnson/Penniman/Blackwell)
 "You Still Want Me"
 "You Do Something to Me"
 "It's Alright"
 "All Day and All of the Night"
 "I Gotta Move"
 "Louie Louie" (Richard Berry)
 "I've Got That Feeling"
 "I Gotta Go Now"
 "Things Are Getting Better"
 "Ev'rybody's Gonna Be Happy"
 "Who'll Be the Next in Line"
 "Set Me Free"
 "I Need You"
 "See My Friends"
 "Never Met a Girl Like You Before"
 "A Well Respected Man"
 "Such a Shame"
 "Wait Till the Summer Comes Along" (Dave Davies)

Disc 2
 "Don't You Fret"
 "Dedicated Follower of Fashion"
 "Sitting On My Sofa"
 "I'm Not Like Everybody Else"
 "Dead End Street"
 "Big Black Smoke"
 "Act Nice & Gentle"
 "Autumn Almanac"
 "Mister Pleasant"
 "Wonderboy"
 "Polly"
 "Days"
 "She's Got Everything"
 "Plastic Man"
 "King Kong"
 ""Mindless Child Of Motherhood" (Dave Davies)
 "This Man He Weeps Tonight" (Dave Davies)
 "Berkeley Mews"

References

External links
Dave Emlem's Kinks discography

The Kinks compilation albums
1987 compilation albums